Lewis and Clark National Wildlife Refuge, near the mouth of the Columbia River, provides wintering and resting areas for an estimated 1,000 tundra swans, 5,000 geese, and 30,000 ducks. Other species include shorebirds and bald eagles.

Estuary waters provide vital food resources for juvenile salmon as they pause to become acclimated to salt water before entering the Pacific Ocean. Bald eagles are present year-round; there are 30 to 35 active nest sites.

Other fish species using the estuary include American shad, smelt, perch, starry flounder, bass, catfish, and Pacific lamprey. Harbor seals use sandbars and mud flats as resting sites at low tides, while seals and California sea lions feed on fish in the estuary. Beaver, raccoon, weasel, mink, muskrat, river otter, Columbian white-tailed deer and invasive nutria also live on the islands.

Gallery

References

 
 
 

National Wildlife Refuges in Oregon
Protected areas of Clatsop County, Oregon
Columbia River
1972 establishments in Oregon
Wetlands of Oregon
Landforms of Clatsop County, Oregon
Protected areas established in 1972